The Circle France (also known as The Circle Game in France) is a French reality competition show, produced by Studio Lambert and Motion Content Group which first aired on Netflix on 9 April 2020 that is based on a British TV series of the same name. Along with The Circle France, Netflix also released separate versions of The Circle in the United States and Brazil. The show bills itself as a game based around social media, with the concept that "anyone can be anyone in The Circle". It has been compared to Big Brother and Catfish in format, as well as Black Mirror episode "Nosedive" with the concept of ratings.

On 9 April 2020, the season was won by Romain Ben, who had played the game as himself, and won the €100,000 prize that came along with it. Éléa Zazu was the runner-up.

Format 
The contestants, or "players", move into the same apartment building. However, the contestants do not meet face-to-face during the course of the competition, as they each live in their own individual apartment. They communicate solely using their profiles on a specially-designed social media app that gives them the ability to portray themselves in any way they choose. Players can thus opt to present themselves as a completely different personality to the other players, a tactic otherwise known as catfishing; for example, one male player in the first season presented himself as a female identity, while another female contestant used photos of a woman she felt was more attractive.

Throughout the series, the contestants "rate" one another from first to last place. At the end of the ratings, their average ratings are revealed to one another from lowest to highest. Normally, the two highest-rated players become "influencers", while the remaining players will be at risk of being "blocked" by the influencers. However, occasionally there may be a twist to the blocking process – varying from the lowest rating players being instantly blocked, the identity of the influencers being a secret, or multiple players being blocked at one time. Blocked players are eliminated from the game, but are given the opportunity to meet one player still in the game in-person. Then, the day after a blocking, a video message is shown to the remaining players to reveal if they were real or fake.

During the finale, the contestants rate each other one final time, where the highest rated player wins the game and €100,000.

Players 
The players were selected from the "20–25 individuals" being cleared to appear on the show, with the remaining people never leaving standby status and not appearing on the show. The first nine players were revealed on The Circle Frances Instagram profile. The players' profiles were revealed as they introduced themselves on-screen during an episode.

Episodes

Background

Concept 
Tim Harcourt is the creative director of Studio Lambert, which produces the British and American versions of the show. Harcourt wondered what a reality show would look like if the people never met face-to-face. He had also been considering the idea of a bird's-eye view-style documentary of an apartment building, seeing into each of their lives. He began to work on The Circle after hearing that Channel 4 was looking for a reality-show format centered on social media.

Development 
The British version of the show premiered in 2018, and was renewed for its second season a few months after the first season ended. After the first season was Channel 4's "youngest profiling" show in six years, according to the British TV industry magazine Broadcast, talks began of international versions. On October 8, 2018, Netflix announced its partnership with All3Media to create three international versions of The Circle on Netflix, including the American version. Brandon Reigg, Netflix's Vice Principal of Unscripted Content, stated, "We think the show's combination of modern social media interaction and competition will captivate Netflix members around the world, in multiple languages, and we're delighted to partner with Studio Lambert and Motion to produce these three new local versions."

Production

Casting 
In an interview with Variety, Tim Harcourt, one of the executive producers for Studio Lambert, stated that The Circle format and premise allowed the casting team to search for all different kinds of people. He noted how the casting contrasted from casts on show like Real Housewives or Jersey Shore and how those shows are "all one gang of quite similar characters." He explained how there was no set cast for the show until it was over. The first eight players to enter were all predetermined and planned, but everything after that was all luck to whoever got on. Harcourt stated that the production team would decide who would be the right fit depending on who just left the game, acknowledging that with thirteen contestants, not all who were possible players end up on the show at all.

Jennifer Teixido was the casting director for The Circle France.

The Circle app 
Each apartment that the players live in is plastered with screens in every room in order for the players be able to hold conversations with other players as they go about their everyday lives. Each player starts out the game by creating a profile. This includes sharing their age, relationship status, a short bio, and one photo to use as their profile picture. Every day, the players are allowed to share a status update, explaining their thoughts for the day. Sometimes, either through rewards or passing a certain milestone, the players are allowed to upload another photo to their profile. However, the main purpose of The Circle ("du Cercle" in French) is to be the only way players can communicate with each other.

At several points during the game, usually every episode, The Circle has the players play a minigame so that they can get to know their fellow players better. Tim Harcourt of Studio Lambert says that "some games were really good for bonding them, some were really good for them learning about each other, some were good for testing who's a catfish, some could have been more divisive."

At certain points during the show, there would be a rating. Players would have to rate each other from first to last by using The Circle and announcing the players they want in each placement. Then, the ratings would be averaged and create an average placement for each player. Depending on how high or low their average placement was, the player's ranking would determine if they became in influencer or not. An influencer is usually the two people who get first and second place at the ratings. The influencers would head to the hangout and discuss over The Circle which person to block.

Filming 
The Circle France was filmed in December 2019, in the same Salford, England apartment building that was also used by American version's first season, the British version's second season, and the Brazilian version's first season. The season was the last of that batch of four seasons filmed.

Release 
On 26 March 2020, the trailer for the French version was released, revealing the premiere date to be 9 April 2020, and the prize amount to be €100,000. All twelve episodes were released on 9 April; this is different from all other versions which released several episodes weekly.

Results and elimination

Notes

Reception 
Joe Keller from Decider, in a regular series called "Stream It or Skip It", told his audience to stream it. His reasons include that the format is still solid and the gist of the show is still fresh, despite four previous international seasons. However, he does comment that the cast is lacking in diversity, especially since this season aired after the "sexually-fluid" cast of the Brazilian version.

References

External links
 
 @circlegame on Instagram

2010s reality television series
French reality television series
French-language Netflix original programming
The Circle (franchise)
Television series about social media